Janabil, Jänäbil Smağululı (born 1934) is a male Chinese politician of Kazakh nationality. He was born in 1934 Kaba (Habahe) County, Xinjiang Uygur Autonomous Region.
Janabil is a Kazakh male name meaning "father's soul".

External links
China Viate Biography
International Who's Who Entry

1934 births
People from Altay Prefecture
People's Republic of China politicians from Xinjiang
Living people
Political office-holders in Xinjiang
Chinese Communist Party politicians from Xinjiang
Ili Kazakh Autonomous Prefecture governors